The 2007 national road cycling championships took place throughout the year, with the majority taking place in late June and early July, although there are some exceptions. The National Championships are an annual event and have taken place for many years.

Jerseys
The winner of each national championship wears the national jersey in all their races for the next year in the respective discipline, apart from the World Championships. The jerseys tend to represent the countries' flag or use the colours from it.

Cancellations
The British championships were cancelled following torrential rain in the week leading up to the event, causing flooding nearby where the races were to be held. It was rescheduled after the Tour de France.

The Czech and Slovakian joint Time Trial championships were cancelled when the route became a detour for a major motorway nearby, which had been blocked due to an accident.

2007 Champions

References 

National Cycling Championships
National road cycling championships by year